The URBA Top 12 (formerly "Torneo de la URBA") is an Argentine rugby union club competition organised by the Buenos Aires Rugby Union (URBA). It is the top division of the Argentine rugby league system. Created on 10 April 1899 by the "River Plate Rugby Union" (current Argentine Rugby Union – UAR), the Top 13 is the oldest rugby competition in South America and one of the oldest club competitions in the world.

Top 12 is one of the country's two main club competitions, along with Torneo del Interior, where clubs from the rest of the Provinces of Argentina take part. The championship runs from March to October.

Despite being from the city of Rosario in Santa Fe Province, Atlético del Rosario has taken part of Top 12 as founding member of the UAR. The other clubs from Rosario compete in tournaments organised by the Rosario governing body.

History 

The River Plate Rugby Union was established in Buenos Aires on 10 April 1899, being its founding members Buenos Aires, Belgrano, Lomas and Flores from Buenos Aires, and Rosario A.C. from Rosario. The first president of the body was Leslie Corry Smith.

That same year, the RPRU organised the first edition of the Buenos Aires' inter-club competition, which inaugural winner team was Lomas. In 1931 the union name was translated into Spanish "Unión de Rugby del Río de la Plata", that remained until 1951 when the union took the definitive "Unión Argentina de Rugby" (UAR).

The first trophy awarded to champions was acquired to British goldsmith Elkington & Son through their representatives in Argentina, C.R. Simons & Co., for a price of guinea 100. Built with Greek style, the trophy displayed a scene of a rugby match, with the legends "River Plate Rugby Union Championship" and "1899". The cup was mounted on an ebony base with little silver badges, where the name of the champion would be engraved year-by-year. Most of the money for its acquisition came from the Rosario A.C. members.

As a result of a reorganization of the UAR in 1995, the Unión de Rugby de Buenos Aires was created to take over the tournament, being named "Torneo de la URBA". From then on, the UAR focused only on national teams while the URBA took over club competitions.

Until 1997 a league system was used, if two or more clubs finished with the same number of points they would share the title. This happened several times, including in 1939 when a record 3 clubs had to share the title. To remedy this, a play-off system leading to a grand final was instaured in 1998. This new system has been in use since then, except in 2001.

In 1998, the URBA introduced the playoff system, with a final match in a neutral venue to determine a unique champion of the season. New changes to the rules were added in 2008, when the fourteen best placed teams at the end of the regular season were eligible to play a second stage, named "Top 14". Every club played each other only once in a single-robin championship (either home or away). At the end of this phase, the first 4 clubs qualified for the semi-finals of the tournament, with the first ranked team meeting the fourth and the second meeting the third. Both semi-finals took place on the same weekend on neutral ground (usually the Club Atlético San Isidro stadium). The winner was crowned URBA champion. This system has remained (with minor changes) since then. The rest of the clubs played in a promotion and relegation competition named "Torneo Reubicación".

Both the URBA winner and runner-up qualified for the Nacional de Clubes semi-finals, where they met the winner and runner-up of Torneo del Interior. The winner of that competition was declared Argentine champion.

In 2016, the URBA introduced changes in the tournament's format for the 2017 season, with the "Top 14" being reduced to 12 teams (therefore renamed "Top 12") and becoming an independent championship, with all of the teams playing each other in a double round-robin tournament (home and away games).

As a result of those changes, the Buenos Aires league system was divided into six tiers. The new format also stated that the four best placed teams at the end of the season, would play the semifinals while the two worst placed would be relegated to the second division.

Format 
The tournament will start on March 25, 2023, with the 12 participant teams playing a double round-robin tournament, which will end on October 15. The four best placed clubs will qualify to the semifinals (played as single matches in neutral venues) on October 29 and 30. Winners will play the final (also a single match) at Club Atlético San Isidro stadium, frecquent venue for URBA finals, on November 5, 2022.

The seven best placed teams in the general table will qualify for Torneo Nacional de Clubes, the main competition of Argentine rugby, which is made up of 9 teams from the rest of the provinces of Argentina and the seven from URBA.

Clubs

Current (2023)
Teams competing at Top 1w in the 2023 seasons are:

Former clubs
Disaffiliated or defunct clubs:

Champions
The complete list of champions is detailed below: 

Notes

Titles by club 

Notes

Broadcasters Rights  
The exclusive rights of Torneo de la URBA are broadcast live on ESPN Extra Saturday at 13:15 and are broadcast delayed on ESPN 2 at 17:30. In the Scrum are broadcast highlights of match Saturday at 23:00 (local time of Argentina, Paraguay and Uruguay), 22:00 (local time of Chile) and 21:00 (local time of Peru).

References

External links
 

Rugby union tournaments for clubs
Sports leagues established in 1899
1899 establishments in Argentina